Night of Dark Shadows is a 1971 horror film by Dan Curtis. It is the sequel to House of Dark Shadows. It centers on the story of Quentin Collins and his bride Tracy at the Collinwood Mansion in Collinsport, Maine.

David Selby, Lara Parker, John Karlen, Kate Jackson, Grayson Hall, and Nancy Barrett star.

Night of Dark Shadows was not as successful as House of Dark Shadows.

This film marked the feature film debut of David Selby and Kate Jackson.

Plot
Handsome young artist Quentin Collins arrives at his newly inherited estate of Collinwood with his beautiful wife Tracy. They meet the housekeeper Carlotta Drake and the caretaker Gerard Stiles. Quentin happens upon a 19th-century portrait of a blonde woman with captivating green eyes that seem to mesmerize him. Carlotta informs him that the woman is Angelique, who had lived there over 100 years earlier. The Collins' friends Alex and Claire Jenkins, who have co-written several successful horror novels, move into a cottage on the estate.

Quentin soon begins to be troubled by startling visions and haunting dreams about one of his ancestors, Charles Collins, and his ancestor's mistress Angelique—who had been hanged as a witch in a past century. Carlotta eventually reveals to Quentin that she is the reincarnation of Sarah Castle, a little girl who had lived at Collinwood over 150 years ago, and that Quentin himself is the reincarnation of Charles Collins. Charles had had an affair with Angelique, wife of his brother Gabriel, resulting in her being hanged—and Charles being sealed alive in the family crypt with Angelique's corpse.

On a trip to New York, the Jenkinses discover a painting of Charles Collins, which bears an uncanny resemblance to Quentin. Convinced that their friends are in grave danger, the couple hurry home to Collinwood, where they are attacked by the ghost of Angelique.

Meanwhile, Quentin has become possessed by the spirit of Charles Collins, and attempts to drown Tracy in a disused swimming pool on the estate. Alex and Claire arrive in time to revive her, but Quentin, having no memory of his actions, refuses to believe their wild tale.

Carlotta and Gerard conspire to eliminate Quentin's loved ones.  Quentin, seeing the scratches on his wrist where Tracy had tried to fend him off, realizes the truth of Alex's warning and rushes to rescue his friends.  Gerard has managed to take Tracy prisoner (despite his having been shot in the face by Claire), and Quentin fights with him high atop a train trestle.  As Gerard slashes Quentin's cheek with a knife, creating a gash in his left cheek that looks remarkably like the one Charles Collins had, Tracy rushes to try to save her husband. She strikes Gerard with a nearby plank, knocking him off Quentin and onto the edge of the trestle. He teeters on the edge for a moment, then plunges to his death after Tracy pushes him.

The group rush back to Collinwood to confront Carlotta. As they arrive, she jumps from the top of the house when she sees the ghostly Angelique beckon her from below.

In the end, the two couples prepare to leave Collinwood forever. Alex and Claire leave first, with Quentin and Tracy following. However, instead of driving away, Quentin returns to the house, saying he intends to retrieve some canvases.  When he fails to come back, Tracy follows, only to find him now completely possessed by Charles Collins. Angelique enters the room, reborn in the flesh. The camera freezes on Tracy's face as she begins to scream, as Quentin and Angelique advance on her.  A UPI news wire shown at the end reveals that Alex and Claire Jenkins have been killed in a car accident. Witnesses reported seeing a ghostly fog filling the car as it veered off the road.

Cast
 David Selby as Quentin Collins and Charles Collins
 Grayson Hall as Carlotta Drake
 John Karlen as Alex Jenkins
 Nancy Barrett as Claire Jenkins
 Lara Parker as Angelique Collins
 Kate Jackson as Tracy Collins
 James Storm as Gerard Stiles
 Diana Millay as Laura Collins
 Christopher Pennock as Gabriel Collins
 Thayer David as Reverend Strack
 Monica Rich as Sarah Castle
 Clarice Blackburn as Mrs. Castle

Production
After the success of House of Dark Shadows (the 1970 feature film version of Dan Curtis's gothic soap opera Dark Shadows), MGM was ready to back a follow-up film in 1971. Curtis originally wanted to do a direct sequel and revive the vampire Barnabas Collins. Actor Jonathan Frid, however, refused to play the role again for fear of being typecast. Realizing it would be a mistake to recast the popular character, Curtis worked with writer Sam Hall to concoct an all-new storyline.

On March 29, 1971, filming began on Curse of Dark Shadows, later retitled Night of Dark Shadows for its release. Without the headaches of producing the television series concurrently, the production crew was able to achieve a far more polished product than that of the previous year. In order to give the production some authenticity, spiritualist Hans Holzer was employed as an advisor to the production, though his actual contribution to the finished product proved minimal.

The story was very loosely based on the "parallel-time" sequence of the TV series and centered on the show's other popular male lead, Quentin Collins, played by David Selby. Night of Dark Shadows was shot in six weeks on a budget of $900,000 and released in 1971, after the show had left the air. It was not unsuccessful but was less successful than its predecessor.

Hall's script, developed in conjunction with Curtis, was a wistful tale of gothic romance and supernatural reincarnation, bolstered by credible performances from David Selby, Kate Jackson, and Grayson Hall. When filming completed without major problems, Curtis set about editing the final film, which proved far denser and more complex than House of Dark Shadows.One reason often cited for the film's lack of performance is that MGM forced Curtis to cut over 35 minutes from his finished film, and gave him only 24 hours to do the job. Thus, the film went from approximately 129 minutes to about 94 minutes, which, according to some, caused the film to lose its coherence.

Much of the excised footage was recovered in 1999, but was without sound. This material consists of 16 never-before-seen sequences, extending over a dozen existing scenes, reinstating the darker mood and restoring the original structure and continuity. Highlights of the discovery include flashback between the doomed lovers Charles and Angelique, two new scenes featuring menacing groundskeeper Gerard Stiles, several romantic interludes between Quentin and Tracy, a candlelit "exorcism" sequence in the gallery (the film's original climax), and the "hanging" sequence, as well as several other scenes with intensity on par with an R-rated film.Dark Shadows Memories: 35th Anniversary, by Kathryn Leigh Scott, Pomegranate Press Ltd., 2001,  

Home mediaNight of Dark Shadows and House of Dark Shadows'' were released on VHS on September 1, 1998, and on DVD and Blu-ray on October 30, 2012 by Warner Home Video.

See also
 List of American films of 1971

References

External links
 
 
 
 
 

1971 films
1971 horror films
American supernatural horror films
Dark Shadows
Films based on television series
Films directed by Dan Curtis
Films set in country houses
Films set in Maine
Films shot in New York (state)
Metro-Goldwyn-Mayer films
1970s English-language films
1970s American films